SV Eintracht Trier 05 is a German association football club based in Trier, Rhineland-Palatinate. It was formed on 11 March 1948 out of the merger of Westmark 05 Trier and Eintracht Trier 06, on the 43rd anniversary of the establishment of predecessor Trier Fußball Club 05. The team badge incorporates Trier's most famous landmark, the Porta Nigra, an ancient Roman city gate still standing in Germany's oldest city.

In the 2020-21 season the team was in 1st place in the Oberliga Rheinland-Pfalz/Saar, however due to the COVID-19 pandemic the season was cut short. Because not enough regular season games were played, no Oberliga teams were promoted to the Regionalliga. The next season they finished second and were promoted to the Regionalliga Sudwest, ending a 5 year stint in the Oberliga.

History

Predecessor clubs (1905–1945) 
Trier FC was established 11 March 1905 and in 1911 was renamed Sport-Verein 05 Trier. In 1930, 05, Fußballverein Kürenz, and Polizei SV Trier were joined to form SV Westmark 05 Trier.

The origins of Eintracht Trier are in the 1906 establishment of Fußball Club Moselland 06 Trier. In 1920, the club joined with FV Fortuna 1910 Trier to create Vereinigte Rasenspieler 1906 Trier, which the following year merged with SV Alemannia 1909 Trier to form SV Eintracht 06 Trier.

Westmark and Eintracht played first in the Bezirksliga Rhein-Saar and then in the Gauliga Mittelrhein, one of 16 top-flight divisions formed through the 1933 re-organization of German football under the Third Reich. Westmark appeared in the opening rounds of the Tschammerpokal, predecessor of today's DFB-Pokal (German Cup) in 1936, advancing past FV Saarbrücken (3–1), before being put out in the next round by VfB Stuttgart (0–1). Both Trier teams were relegated in 1936 and did not re-appear in the top-flight until 1941 when they were both promoted to the Gauliga Moselland, Gruppe West.

Westmark was relegated at the end of the season, however Eintracht fared slightly better, lasting a further two seasons before being sent down. Player shortage during World War II forced the mergers of many clubs into combined wartime clubs known as Kriegspielgemeinshaft, and in 1943, the two clubs were joined as KSG Eintracht/Westmark Trier. The team won only a single point in 11 matches, conceding 52 goals and scoring just 13. By 1944, the region was strongly affected by the war and matches of the Gauliga Moselland were eventually suspended.

 Post-war (1945–2000) 

The two clubs re-emerged as separate sides after the conflict but joined to one club on 11 March 1948 as SV Eintracht Trier 05. The newly combined side resumed playing in the top-flight Oberliga Südwest (Gruppe Nord), but were never a serious contender at that level, consistently finishing well behind the leaders. By the time the Bundesliga, the new nationwide professional football league, was formed in 1963, the club played in the second division.

They continued to play tier II football in the Regionalliga Südwest until slipping to the Amateurliga Rheinland (III) in 1973. Eintracht's second team amateur side had also made an appearance in the Amateurliga for a single season in 1970–71. The senior side performed well in the Amateurliga after their descent, but failed in a bid to advance at the end of the 1975–76 season after winning their division and then finishing second in the relegation play-off group. The following year, Trier again captured the Amateurliga title, but this time were successful in their bid to move up to the 2. Bundesliga Süd. However, they performed poorly there and were in 17th place at the end of the 1976–77 campaign. The club avoided relegation only because Röchling Völklingen, who had finished above Eintracht, were denied a license for financial reasons. Trier was able to turn their narrow escape into a five-year stay in the second division.

In 1981, the Nord and Süd divisions of the 2. Bundesliga were combined, and the number of teams playing tier II football reduced from 42 to 20. Trier missed the cut with an 8th-place finish and found themselves playing in the Amateuroberliga Südwest (III). The club went on to perform well through the next decade and on into the mid-1990s, earning a string of top three finishes which included Amateurliga titles in 1986, 1993, and 1994 and consecutive German Amateur Championships in 1988 and 1989. They also enjoyed an extended run in the 1998 DFB-Pokal (German Cup) tournament, advancing to the semi-finals before finally being put out by MSV Duisburg in a match that ended in a 1–1 draw before being decided 9–10 on penalty kicks. However, the team failed in four opportunities (1987, 1992, 1993, 1999) to win its way back to second division play and remained a mid-table side in the Regionalliga West/Südwest and Regionalliga West for most of the 1990s and on into the new millennium.

 Recent history 
From 2002 to 2005, the club enjoyed a three-season spell in the 2. Bundesliga, earning their highest finish with a 7th-place result in 2003.

The decline of the club began with relegation to the Regionalliga (III) in 2005. Club manager Paul Linz resigned and was replaced by former Trier Captain Micheal Prus. The start of the Regionalliga season was disappointing and led to replacement of the former manager with Eugen Hach in October 2005, which however failed to stop the decline. The team was again relegated and started the 2006–07 season in the Oberliga Südwest (IV).

The aim of the club was promotion straight back to the Regionalliga and the men in charge of this challenge were Adnan Kevric and Roland Seitz. However, Seitz left to take over at SC Paderborn within just a few days of his appointment. Kevric was to see out the rest of the season with the team before resigning his position on 3 March 2007 after a 2–0 home defeat at the hands of FV Engers 07 which finally ended all hopes for promotion. Herbert Herres then took over as head coach, but he in turn resigned as manager on 3 April 2007 following a 3–1 defeat against SpVgg EGC Wirges. Former player Werner Kartz took over until the end of the season.

Under Kartz the team was able to lift itself once again and even managed to win the Rhineland Cup after a 2–1 victory over TuS on 7 June 2007, leading to qualification to the opening round of the DFB-Pokal. On 5 August 2007, Trier met FC Schalke 04 at the sold out Moselstadion with tickets for this event changing hands on eBay for over 60 euros per ticket. Trier did not stand a chance and was beaten 9:0 by the Bundesliga side.

The plan for the 2007–08 season was to finish in the top four of the Oberliga Südwest (IV) to ensure promotion into the newly formed Regionalliga West (IV) for the 2008–09 season. The team met this objective in a 5–0 win over Eintracht Bad Kreuznach that locked their place in the top four. It played in this league until 2012 when it became part of the new Regionalliga Südwest.

 Stadium 
In 1934, the club built its present home The Moselstadion. The Moselstadion is set in the midst of a sports complex surrounded by several sports fields and tennis courts. The stadium holds a maximum of 10,254 spectators with approximately 2,000 seats and terracing for a further 8,000 spectators, of which 2,000 spaces are covered. The stadium has been gradually improved since it was built culminating in the erection of floodlight masts in 1998 in time for the DFB-Pokal semi-final against Duisburg.

The stadium no longer conforms to the DFL licensing regulations and there are plans for a new, modern stadium in Trier, however following the relegation of the club to the Oberliga Rheinland-Pfalz/Saar these plans are currently on hold.

 Current squad 

 Staff 
DirectorsChairman  Alfons JochemVice-President  Roman GottschalkSporting director  Horst BrandHead Coach  Josef ÇınarAssistant Coach	
  Fahrudin KuduzovićPhysical Coach  Kevin HeinzGoalkeeper Coach  Jochen PfaffTeam-Doctor  Dr. Friedl SchulzPhysiotherapists  Guido Hartmann
  Pascal Lex

 Reserve Squad: SV Eintracht Trier 05 II  
SV Eintracht Trier 05 II currently plays in Rheinland Kreisliga C Trier/Eifel 

 	
Staff:Team Manager	
  Stefan FleckCoach  Timo ZeimetAssistant Coach  Christian SteinbachPhysiotherapist''
  Jonas Backes

Honours 
The club's honours:

League 
 German amateur championship
 Champions: 1988, 1989
 2. Oberliga Südwest (II)
 Runners-up: 1963
 Amateurliga Rheinland (III)
 Champions: 1975, 1976
 Runners-up: 1974
 Oberliga Südwest (III)
 Champions: 1987, 1993, 1994
 Runners-up: 1984, 1988, 1989, 1991
 Regionalliga West/Südwest (III)
 Runners-up: 1999
 Regionalliga Süd (III)
 Runners-up: 2002
 Regionalliga West (IV)
 Runners-up: 2011

Cup 
 Rhineland Cup (Tiers III-VII)
 Winners: 1982, 1984, 1985, 1990, 1997, 2001, 2007, 2008, 2009, 2010, 2011, 2013, 2014, 2016
 Runners-up: 1974, 1991, 1992, 1995, 1996, 1999, 2017

Reserve team 
 Rheinlandliga (V-VI)
 Champions: 2005, 2011
 Rhineland Cup
 Runners-up: 2003

Recent managers 
Recent managers of the club:

Recent seasons 
The recent season-by-season performance of the club:

 With the introduction of the Regionalligas in 1994 and the 3. Liga in 2008 as the new third tier, below the 2. Bundesliga, all leagues below dropped one tier. In 2012, the number of Regionalligas was increased from three to five with all Regionalliga West clubs from the Saarland and Rhineland-Palatinate entering the new Regionalliga Südwest.

Other 
To mark the 100-year anniversary of the club in 2005 Leiendecker Bloas wrote the club anthem "Für uns geddet nur Eintracht Trier (2005)" ("For us there is only Eintracht Trier"). The club also use the terrace anthem You'll Never Walk Alone to inspire the team and is usually sung as the team enters the pitch.

Former players

References

External links 
  
 Abseits Guide to German Soccer
 Eintracht Trier at Weltfussball.de
 Das deutsche Fußball-Archiv historical German domestic league tables 

 
Sport in Trier
Football clubs in Germany
Football clubs in Rhineland-Palatinate
Association football clubs established in 1905
1905 establishments in Germany
2. Bundesliga clubs